Katong is a residential neighbourhood in the eastern portion of the Central Region of Singapore, within the Marine Parade planning area. Katong district stretches from Ford Road area to Joo Chiat area. It used to be located by the sea, before land reclamation towards the south to East Coast Park was created for housing and recreational purposes beginning in the 1960s to 1970s.

Katong was the location of many villas and mansions of the wealthy elite in the late 19th to the mid-20th centuries. They made their fortunes in the Far East and built seaside resorts, villas and manors along the beachfront of Katong, beginning from Katong Park to the end of the East Coast.

Katong's rich cultural mix has contributed to its unique cuisine. Katong is well known among locals as a food district with a variety of shophouse restaurants serving Peranakan cuisine and particularly, a spicy Singaporean noodle soup known as Katong laksa. Its famous icons include Joo Chiat Rd's food street, Duman food center, Koon Seng Road & Everitt Road 's Peranakan conservation house, Eurasian Heritage Gallery.

Etymology
Tanjong Katong was a popular beach along the East Coast. Tanjong means cape in Malay. This coastal feature was located near the present Tanjong Katong Flyover across East Coast Parkway and has since disappeared due to land reclamation.

When directly translated to English, it is known as Turtle Cape.

History

Katong's history has been rooted in prestige and wealth. Many wealthy English, Portuguese, Anglo-French and Chinese settlers bought parcels of land there beside the sea to cultivate plantations. They built business empires from trading in these early international commodities such as cotton, coconut and gambier. The majority of which, are viewable along Mountbatten Road.

In the early twentieth century, Katong had a prominent landmark. Located in the coastal area was Kampong Amber. Some of the more notable buildings in the proximity includes the Chinese Swimming Club and the Mandalay Villa. It was a Malay fishing village (kampong) that used to exist in the area between East Coast Road and Amber Road. The inhabitants were mainly Peranakans and Malay fishermen. Kampong Amber was named after the Amber Road which it was adjacent to. Amber road was named after the family clan name of Joseph Aaron Elias, a prominent property owner in early-20th-century Singapore. During the industrialisation phase of Singapore in the 1970s and 1980s, Kampong Amber was not spared when kampongs were destroyed to give way for economic developments.

Katong developed from a weekend seaside retreat into a home for the wealthy, who built their main residence away from the hustle and bustle of town-life in the form of ornate and immense colonial seaside bungalows. Katong then took the form of a wealthy suburb. Large colonial, Chinese and Peranakan bungalows were built along Meyer Road and Mountbatten Road from Katong Park to Tanjong Katong. By 1928 Katong had grown to the extent that the Inspector-General of Police H. Fairburn remarked: "The development of the area from Katong to Joo Chiat, which has been so rapid in the past two years, promises to continue, and from every point of view one sees the necessity of providing for a sub-divisional station in the suburb. The suburb at present possess no police station." From then on Katong encroached into Joo Chiat area from Tanjong Katong to Telok Kurau Road. East Coast Road (now divided into East Coast Road and Upper East Coast Road) have many upper-class family homes.

The present Katong area stretches from Mountbatten Road, East Coast Road to Siglap. The Katong in Joo Chiat was formally an ethnic enclave of the Eurasians. Convent of the Holy Infant Jesus in Katong (CHIJ Katong) was built much later on Martia Road and expanded its secondary school into Marine Parade after land reclamation of the East Coast in 1965.

The Eurasians wanted better homes after the depression; however, the city centre of Singapore and its surrounding area was experiencing congestion and pollution with overcrowding being common. Therefore, they sold their estates in town and built their homes in Katong. The Chinese settlers followed suit.

Kampong Amber
Kampong Amber existed as early as the 20th century. It was a Malay fishing village (kampong) that used to exist in the area between East Coast Road and Amber Road. It was located right before the coastal area of Katong. The inhabitants were mainly Peranakans and Malay fishermen. Like any kampongs in Singapore, a kampong is normally named after the main road it is adjacent to, hence this was how Kampong Amber’s name came to be. Amber road was named after the family clan name of Joseph Aaron Elias, a prominent property owner in early-20th-century Singapore. During the industrialisation phase of Singapore in the 1970s and 1980s, Kampong Amber was not spared when kampongs were eradicated to open up land for economic developments. Kampong Amber occupants were subsequently relocated to newly built, government subsidised flats. High-rise flats and privatised developments were later constructed at the site. Sir Winston Churchill once famously remarked, “We shape our buildings; thereafter they shape us”. As the architecture and urban landscape (physical environment) morphed and developed drastically over the years, from Kampong Amber to the modern-day Amber road developments – the same level of change could be observed of the social activities it hosts, the occupants it invites and the genius loci of the place.

Before the 1970s, there were little to no boundaries drawn between the wealthy businessmen of Katong and the poor fishermen of Kampong Amber. Kampong Amber was filled with thatched timber houses on stilts owned by the poor fishermen, and beachfront bungalows built by the wealthy Chinese businessmen can be found just across Amber road. The villagers lived side by side with the wealthy Chinese businessmen, most prominent of whom was Lee Choon Guan and his wife. Mr and Mrs Lee lived opposite Kampong Amber, at No. 29 Amber Road, by the seaside. Mr and Mrs Lee Choon Guan were notable for their philanthropic actions. They owned the land which Kampong Amber sits on, and allowed the villagers to live rent-free. As a show of appreciation for their family kindness, the villagers of Kampong Amber held annual parade on Mrs Lee’s birthday. The relationship between Mr and Mrs Lee and the villagers was a sign of a blurred boundary between the rich and the poor and shows a significant level of interaction between the two.

It was only with the implementation of 1971 Concept Plan and 1980 Masterplan that starts to imposed physical and invisible boundaries between the rich and the poor. It was with these plans that East Coast land reclamation was carried out, and the original inhabitants of Kampong Amber were relocated into government subsidised flats. It was in a subsequent master plan for 2003 that parcelled the land for further development. Due to the transformation of the swampy coastline that spread of foul smell, to a scenic coastline that was filled with white sandy beaches – it formally became a popular spot for high end residential development. As a result, the place became exclusively for the rich. There were no longer signs of coexistence of the rich and the poor, that was once a common sight around Kampong Amber.

Before the 1970s, Kampong Amber was filled with thatched timber houses on stilts. The arrangement of the houses was irregular, clustered and created a highly porous urban fabric. The configuration of the urban environment was echoed in the social activities of its inhabitants. The communities that existed in the kampong were close knitted. Between the houses in Kampong Amber sandwiched many large communal spaces, spaces that suggested and encouraged activities among neighbours in the kampong. As such, the inhabitants of Kampong Amber were observed to spend much of their time outdoors in these spaces. They could be doing house chores in the outdoor under their house’s veranda, like plucking beansprout or pounding chilli paste, or they could be talking to their neighbours in such spaces for an extended duration. It was during a special occasion that the ‘kampong (communal) spirit’ was more evident. The neighbours would all gather under a same roof and gotong royong. Gotong royong is a Malay term meaning working together, something that was very common back during the days of Kampong Amber. In the present, most of the communal activities happens only within private boundaries. All the condominium development that now stand in the land parcel erects walls as a physical demarcation of private spaces. The privatisation of land and communal spaces is affecting the type of social activities in the community. The social activities, as a resultant of the urban fabric, were more introverted and happens only within boundaries.

Before the land reclamation of East Coast, that was carried out between 1963 and 1985 as part of 1971 Concept Plan, Kampong Amber sits right before the sea. During this period, there was a strong relationship between Kampong Amber’s inhabitants and the sea. The sea was the inhabitants’ food source, their livelihood, and the beach was where the fishermen would sell their catch every morning. Since the soil in Kampong Amber contains high salt levels, due to the proximity with the sea, the land was not ideal for growing vegetable and fruits. Thus, the sea became the main livelihood of the inhabitants. In addition, even though the same roads existing today existed back then, there were significantly fewer cars on the road. The spaces between the sea and Kampong Amber were very permeable, villagers of the kampong could be observed to be crossing the roads freely to and from the sea. This drew closer the distance between the two. However, today after the land reclamation, the original land parcel no longer enjoys the close proximity with the sea. Furthermore, the land parcel is cut off by the huge traffic of the roads, making it more inconvenient for the inhabitants of the land parcel to go to the sea.

Kampong Amber residents were eventually relocated in the 1970s, and the site was razed into a clean slate to allow for development. The only trace of the old Kampong Amber is the position of the Chinese Swimming Club. Upon the tabula rasa of Kampong Amber, four to eight storeys residential buildings were built in its place. Together with the new buildings were physical walls and fences to define the boundary of the development. The place was no longer as porous and public as before. The once large and plentiful communal spaces were reduced to just a pedestrian walkway on the periphery of the new buildings developments. The kampong spirit was destroyed together with the timber houses that once filled the place. On hindsight within a short period of 30 years, the place went through another phase of tabula rasa. The low to mid rise buildings were replaced with the high-rise private residential developments. The present buildings of Amber Hotel, The Aristo @ Amber’s car porch were the remnants of the 1980s Kampong Amber. The car porch of The Aristo @ Amber was once part of a beachfront bungalow known as the Butterfly House. It is only the physical traces that were preserved, but the spirit of the place was long gone. Even though there were efforts to preserve the physical elements of the past, the way the elements were preserved were insensitive. The Butterfly House was built in 1912 by Regent A. J. Bidwell. The bungalow was known as the 'Butterfly House' due to its iconic curve walls that forms its car porch. The Butterfly House occupies an important place for the residents who once stayed along Amber road. Today, with a large part of the original building demolished, the remaining part of the house had been 'integrated' into a new 18-storey condominium development, one with a contrasting scale and style.

With the urban fabric of Kampong Amber changing drastically over the years, there is something that remained constant. The Chinese Swimming Club stood in that position, in Kampong Amber, since 1921 and oversaw all the changes that happened over the last century. Even though the buildings of Chinese Swimming Club were not the same, since it went through a series of redesign and rebuilt phases, the significance it plays for its community remained. It had been a prominent landmark of Kampong Amber and was the heart of the Chinese community. The club was founded in 1909 but only moved to a permanent site at Amber Road in 1921. The club rented Bungalow C from wealthy philanthropist Lee Choon Guan, who was also the club's patron. Back then, the club was the Chinese response to the exclusive European-only Singapore Swimming Club set up by the British in 1894. The Chinese Swimming Club was a prominent gathering place, for many English-speaking middle-class families living in Katong. Since then, it had helped Singapore produce many world-class athletes. The club drew many notable visits from prominent people in Singapore back then, such as Prime Minister Lee Kuan Yew in 1966, President Wee Kim Wee in 1992 and President Tony Tan Keng Yam in 2013. In the present day, the club had since extended its membership to non-Chinese and even permanent residents of Singapore. As the years go by, as the Chinese Swimming Club continues to be a prominent communal spot where the inhabitants gather, it only grows as the heart of Amber road community that stood out within the Condominiums such as Amber Park, Nyon at Amber, Grand Dunman, Tembusu Grand and The Continuum.

From the observation of the transformation of Kampong Amber to modern day Amber Road development, on the same site, the social activities and genius loci of the place is closely tied to the quality of the urban environment and architecture. The porous and open urban fabric of the 1900s Kampong Amber resulted in a place filled of ‘kampong’ (communal) spirit, one that encourages sharing and public interaction between its inhabitants. In comparison, the modern-day Amber road development, with walled-up high rise development replacing the thatched timber houses on stilts, had lost the same spirit of gotong royong that previously gave identity to the place. The identity and spirit (the body), of the Malay fishermen’s village had long been destroyed along with its skeleton. While the loss of the physical buildings is irrevocable. The spirit and identity of place becomes irretrievable. More so than just preserving the physical remnants of the past, same effort should be spent on preserving the spirit of the place. It is therefore important to preserve places like the Chinese Swimming Club which continues to be a prominent communal spot for the inhabitants, and be an avenue for them to retrace their roots.

Highlights
The area is traditionally associated with the Eurasian and Peranakan community. However, many high-rise apartment blocks now stand alongside the traditional shophouses and Peranakan terrace houses. In 1993, the Joo Chiat neighbourhood which comprises the historical centre of Katong, with its uniquely Singaporean architecture mixing Chinese, Peranakan and English colonial styles, was designated a national heritage conservation area by the Singapore Government. The conservation area consists of many shop houses which are refurnished into cafes as well as specialty shops.

Residents
It was home to the earlier scions of the Englishmen Lord Mountbatten of Burma and Cathay Organisation film magnate, Loke Wan Tho. Its illustrious residents include the ancestral family of Minister Mentor Lee Kuan Yew and Senior Minister Goh Chok Tong. The former President Sellapan Ramanathan lived in Katong in his primary residence on Ceylon Road. Also home to performance artist Nicholas Tee.

Politics
Katong is part of the Marine Parade Group Representation Constituency whose Member of Parliament is Former Prime Minister and Emeritus Senior Minister Goh Chok Tong (Marine Parade), Fatimah Lateef (Geylang Serai) and Edwin Tong (Joo Chiat) of the People's Action Party. More than half of Katong falls under SM Goh's Marine Parade constituency.

In popular culture
Katong Miss Oh, a sitcom that aired on MediaCorp Channel 8 in 2002.
Tanjong Katong is mentioned in a song "Nak Dara Rindu" by actor, filmmaker, musician, and composer P. Ramlee

See also

 Joo Chiat Road
 Katong laksa

References

Further reading
 Victor R Savage, Brenda S A Yeoh (2003), Toponymics – A Study of Singapore Street Names, Eastern Universities Press, 
 The Singapore House 1819–1942 by Lee Kip Lin (pg 119)
 Yuen, Belinda. "Searching for place identity in Singapore." Habitat International, 2005. Volume 29, p. 197–214. Received 29 November 2002; received in revised form 17 June 2003; accepted 25 July 2003. Available on SciVerse ScienceDirect.

Places in Singapore
Marine Parade